Ivo Wolfgang Eduard Schricker (18 March 1877 – 10 January 1962) was a German footballer and the third General Secretary of the FIFA, serving from 1932 to 1951 upon his resignation.

Biography
Ivo Schricker was son of a privy councilor in Strasbourg, which at that time belonged to the German Empire. He came from a middle-class background and played his youth football together with his younger brother Erwin with local team Straßburger FV. During the summer of 1894 both brothers moved as a high school students to Karlsruhe. Here they joined and played for Karlsruher FV, where they met Walter Bensemann, the great pioneer of German and European football.

During Basel's 1895–96 season both brothers played two games for FC Basel. The first game they played was the home game on 1 December 1895 as Basel played a 2–2 draw with FC Excelsior Zürich. Joan Gamper was team mate in that game. The second game they played with Basel was on 8 March 1896 as Basel were defeated 1–3 by Grasshopper Club. Both Schricker's played only these two games for Basel, without scoring a goal.

Following their time with Basel both returned to their club of origin Straßburger FV and later both again moved to Karlsruher Kickers. Erwin Schricker (22 August 1878 – 20 October 1914) was killed in action during World War One.

While studying in Berlin Ivo Schricker played for Akademischer SC 1893 Berlin. With Karlsruher FV he became South German champion several times. In 1899 he was among the best players in the first—still unofficial—game against a team from England, and in September 1901, he also played in London.

Schricker's home town, Strasbourg in Alsace, was after World War I annexed to France again. 
After retirement as player, Schricker served from 1923 to 1925 as president of the South German association (Süddeutscher Fußball-Verband).

He moved to Zürich in Switzerland, a central and conveniently located place that fitted FIFA needs well when a permanent office was set up. Ivo Schricker became the organisation's first employee, and was appointed Permanent Secretary in 1931, working in a 30 square metre apartment at Bahnhofstrasse 77 that remained the home of football's governing body until 1954. From 1948 onwards, he was supported by secretary Marta Kurmann.

Notes

Footnotes

References 
 Henry Wahlig: Dr. Ivo Schricker. Ein Deutscher in Diensten des Weltfußballs, in: Lorenz Peiffer / Dietrich Schulze-Marmeling (Hg.): Hakenkreuz und rundes Leder. Fußball im Nationalsozialismus, S. 197 – 206, Göttingen 2008

Sources
 Rotblau: Jahrbuch Saison 2017/2018. Publisher: FC Basel Marketing AG. 
 Die ersten 125 Jahre. Publisher: Josef Zindel im Friedrich Reinhardt Verlag, Basel. 
 Verein "Basler Fussballarchiv" Homepage

1877 births
1962 deaths
Footballers from Strasbourg
German footballers
German football referees
Alsatian-German people
RC Strasbourg Alsace players
Karlsruher FV players
FC Basel players
FIFA officials
People from Alsace-Lorraine
Association football defenders